Campeon (NOM: 1107, DOT: 94) is a tequila produced from Blue Agave grown in the Eastern Highlands of Jalisco in Mexico.  Campeon has received several medals in the 2011 San Francisco World Spirits Competition.

Production
According to their claim Campeon Tequila only distilled twice "to achieve ... maximum flavor and intensity"

Products
 Campeon Silver
 Campeon Reposado
 Campeon Anejo

Awards
 2011 Bronze Medal for Campeon Reposado tequila
 2011 Silver Medal for Campeon Silver tequila
 2011 Gold Medal for Campeon Anejo tequila

References

Tequila
Drink companies of Mexico